The Bowlie Weekender was a music festival curated by Belle & Sebastian at the Pontin's Holiday camp in Camber Sands, Sussex between Friday 23 and Sunday 25 April 1999.

The event was the inspiration for All Tomorrow's Parties, a music festival held at the same venue in Sussex every year from 2000 until it moved to Butlin's Minehead in 2006.

As part of the festival's tenth year celebrations, Belle & Sebastian was invited to curate an ATP weekend in December 2010, dubbed "Bowlie 2".

In August 2019, to celebrate the 20th anniversary of the first festival, Belle & Sebastian held a third festival, dubbed the "Boaty Weekender". Unlike the previous two festivals, the Boaty Weekender was held on the Norwegian Pearl cruise ship in the Mediterranean Sea (sailing from Barcelona) instead of Camber Sands.

1999 Lineup
The lineup included:
AC Acoustics
Amphetameanies
Belle & Sebastian
Broadcast
Camera Obscura
Cinema
Cornelius
Dean and Sean (Dean Wareham and Sean Eden of Luna)
The Delgados
The Divine Comedy
The Flaming Lips
Vic Godard
Godspeed You! Black Emperor
The Ladybug Transistor
Looper
Mercury Rev
Mogwai
The Pastels
Salako
Sleater-Kinney
Snow Patrol
Sodastream
Jon Spencer Blues Explosion
Teenage Fanclub
V-Twin
Bill Wells Octet

DJs
Jarvis Cocker
Tim Gane
Steve Lamacq
Steve Mackey
Justin Spear
Andrew Symington

2010 lineup
The 2010 lineup included:

 Belle & Sebastian
 Julian Cope
 The Vaselines
 Frightened Rabbit
 Field Music
 Howlin Rain
 Those Dancing Days
 Teenage Fanclub
 Isobel Campbell (with Mark Lanegan)
 The New Pornographers
 Vashti Bunyan
 Silver Columns
 Foals
 Crystal Castles
 Dean Wareham
 Mulatu Astatke
 Edwyn Collins
 Steve Mason
 Dirty Projectors
 The Zombies
 Jenny and Johnny
 Sons And Daughters
 Trembling Bells
 Abagail Grey
 The 1900s
 1990s
 Best Coast
 The Phenomenal Handclap Band
 Amphetameanies
 Peter Parker
 Them Beatles
 Wild Beasts
 Camera Obscura
 Saint Etienne
 The Go! Team
 Laetitia Sadier
 Stevie Jackson
 Franz Ferdinand (Secret Band)
 Jane Weaver
 Daniel Kitson and Gavin Osborn
 Zoey Van Goey

2019 "Boaty Weekender" lineup
 Belle & Sebastian
 Mogwai
 Yo La Tengo
 Camera Obscura
 Teenage Fanclub
 Django Django
 Alvvays
 Buzzcocks (with Steve Diggle on vocals)
 Japanese Breakfast
 The Vaselines
 Honeyblood
 Hinds
 Kelly Lee Owens
 Nilüfer Yanya
 Whyte Horses
 Tracyanne & Danny
 Alex Edelman
 Propaganda
Elizabeth Electra
Campfire Social
Wet Look
Wojtek the Bear

References

Belle and Sebastian
Music festivals in East Sussex
 Music cruises
 Indie rock festivals